Syama Prasad Mukherjee
 Shyamaprasad Mukherjee
 Shyama Prasad Mukherji College